Novopavlovsk is a town and the administrative center of Kirovsky District in Stavropol Krai, Russia, located on the left bank of the Kura River. Population:

History
It was founded in 1777.

Administrative and municipal status
Within the framework of administrative divisions, Novopavlovsk serves as the administrative center of Kirovsky District. As an administrative division, it is incorporated within Kirovsky District as the Town of Novopavlovsk. As a municipal division, the Town of Novopavlovsk is incorporated within Kirovsky Municipal District as Novopavlovsk Urban Settlement.

References

Notes

Sources

Cities and towns in Stavropol Krai
Populated places established in 1777